Irwin LaRocque OOC is the immediate former Secretary-General of the Caribbean Community, who was appointed in 2011. He is from Dominica.

In 2022, LaRocque was awarded the Order of the Caribbean Community, the highest award that can be conferred upon a Caribbean national.

References

Living people
Year of birth missing (living people)
Dominica diplomats
Caribbean Community people
Recipients of the Order of the Caribbean Community